{|
{{Infobox ship image
| Ship image = 
| Ship caption = INS Cuddalore"
}}

|}

INS Cuddalore (M69) was a modified  of the Pondicherry class ships that were in service with the Indian Navy.

 Construction and commissioning Cuddalore was built by the Sredne-Nevskiy Shipyard at Saint Petersburg, Russia. Except for the addition of surface-to-air missiles.  Cuddalore was commissioned on 29 October 1987 at Riga (erstwhile USSR). Her commissioning commanding officer was Rear Admiral PK Nair. 

 Service history Cuddalore was based at Indian Navy's Eastern Naval Command in Visakhapatnam and was operationally under the authority of the Naval Officer-in-Charge Andra Pradesh region. She was the senior ship of the 21st Mine Counter measures (MCM) Squadron.  Cuddalore was adjudged as the "best ship" at the Eastern Naval Command (ENC)’s annual flotilla awards ceremony for the year 2015-16. 

 Decommissioning Cuddalore'' was decommissioned on 23 March 2018 at the naval dockyard in Visakhapatnam.

References 

Ships built in the Soviet Union
Pondicherry-class minesweepers
India–Soviet Union relations
1988 ships
Ships built at Sredne-Nevskiy Shipyard